Argentochiloides is a genus of moths of the family Crambidae.

Species
Argentochiloides meridionalis Bassi, 1999
Argentochiloides xanthodorsellus Bleszynski, 1961

References

Crambinae
Crambidae genera
Taxa named by Stanisław Błeszyński
Taxa described in 1961